Packet may refer to:

 A small container or pouch
 Packet (container), a small single use container
 Cigarette packet
 Sugar packet
 Network packet, a formatted unit of data carried by a packet-mode computer network
 Packet radio, a form of amateur radio data communications using the AX25 protocol
 Packet trade, regularly scheduled cargo, passenger, and mail trade conducted by ship
 Packet boat, type of boat used for scheduled mail or passenger service
 C-82 Packet, a U.S. military transport aircraft
 Packet Newspapers, British newspaper group

See also
 
 
 Package (disambiguation)
 Pack (disambiguation)
 Kit (disambiguation)
 MacGuffin - A plot device in the form of some goal, desired object, or another motivator popularized in the 1930s by Alfred Hitchcock: "Taken from a story about two men on a train. One man says, 'What's that package up there in the baggage rack?' And the other answers, 'Oh, that's a MacGuffin'. The first one asks, 'What's a MacGuffin?'"